Pholidophoretes is an extinct genus of prehistoric ray-finned fish that lived during the Carnian stage of the Late Triassic epoch.

See also

 Prehistoric fish
 List of prehistoric bony fish

References

External links
 

Pholidophoridae
Prehistoric ray-finned fish genera
Late Triassic fish
Triassic fish of Europe